The Ithaca Times is a weekly alternative newspaper serving the Ithaca, New York area. It is a member of the Association of Alternative Newsmedia. New issues of the paper are published every Wednesday. As of December 2015, it had a circulation of 18,125. It was founded on August 31, 1972, originally as the Ithaca New Times. In late 1977, the Ithaca New Times merged with the Good Times Gazette, which had been founded in 1973, to form the Ithaca Times. The first issue of the newly renamed paper was published for June 22/28, 1978, with volume and issue numbers both resetting to 1. Every year, during September, the Ithaca Times does a special "Best of Ithaca" issue, which is based on submissions from a readers' poll and determines some of the best things to see, visit, and do around Ithaca. During December, the Ithaca Times does a special "Give Local" issue that showcases several local non-profit organizations and the work they do in the community. In late 2018, the Ithaca Times began a newsletter for its subscribers called Ithaca Times Daily.

References

External links

Alternative weekly newspapers published in the United States
Newspapers established in 1972
1972 establishments in New York (state)
Mass media in Ithaca, New York
Newspapers published in New York (state)